Steve Douglas (c. 1911 – October 8, 1981) was a Canadian sportscaster, most notably with CBC Sports.

Born in Ottawa, the only child of Hockey Hall of Fame goaltender Percy LeSueur, Douglas' broadcasting career began in 1930 as the play-by-play announcer for the home games of Syracuse's International Hockey League entry.  Following the outbreak of World War II, Douglas enlisted in the Royal Canadian Air Force, serving for three years. After the war, he worked at CKOC in Hamilton, CKLW in Windsor, WWNC in Asherville, North Carolina, and to NBC, where he worked free lance in Washington and Baltimore; in 1953, he joined the CBC.

Douglas was a sports anchor for CBLT in Toronto and an announcer for the CFL on CBC from 1953 to 1965. At the CBC, Douglas called ten Grey Cups and the 1964 Tokyo Olympics and hosted Weekend in Sports,  Football Huddle, Locker Room, and World of Sport. Douglas' contract was not renewed by CBC in 1965 because he objected to the network's decision to cut the daily sportscast from fifteen minutes to eight minutes. After his time with the CBC, Douglas worked for the Ontario Jockey Club and later moved to Barrie where he covered sports for CKVR-TV.

Douglas died October 8, 1981 at the age of 70 following an illness. He was survived by his wife Maria and four children: daughters Ilma Mowery, Frances Nickolaus and Kathryn, and son Michael.

References

1910s births
1981 deaths
Canadian television personalities
Canadian radio sportscasters
Canadian Football League announcers
Royal Canadian Air Force personnel